PU Puppis (PU Pup) is a class B8III (blue giant) star in the constellation Puppis. Its apparent magnitude is 4.69 and it is approximately 620 light years away based on parallax.

It is a β Lyrae variable, ranging from 4.75 to 4.69 magnitude with a period of 2.58 days. The secondary is estimated at about 5.6 magnitude, although recent observations have failed to confirm it. The primary has a mass of 4.10 solar masses, and is radiating at an effective temperature of 11,500 K. The secondary, with a mass 65% that of the Sun, has a surface temperature of about 5,000 K.

References

Puppis
B-type giants
Beta Lyrae variables
Puppis, m
Puppis, PU
CD-25 4828
2944
061429
037173